Alexandros Arnarellis (born 1 October 1991) is a Greek professional footballer who plays as a winger for Super League 2 club Kalamata.

References

1991 births
Living people
Super League Greece players
Super League Greece 2 players
Football League (Greece) players
Gamma Ethniki players
Apollon Smyrnis F.C. players
Vyzas F.C. players
Kallithea F.C. players
PAE Kerkyra players
Trikala F.C. players
Panegialios F.C. players
Doxa Drama F.C. players
Association football wingers
Footballers from Athens
Greek footballers